Bryan-Clovis Ngwabije (born 30 May 1998) is a professional footballer who plays as a centre-back for Andrézieux-Bouthéon. Born in France, he represents the Rwanda national team.

Professional career
A youth product of Lyon, Ngwabije began his career with their reserve side, before stints with Andrézieux and Guingamp II. On 6 June 2020, he transferred to Sporting Lyon in the Championnat National.

International career
Born in France, Ngwabije is of Rwandan descent. He was called up to represent the Rwanda national team for friendlies in June 2021. He debuted for Rwanda in a 2–0 friendly win over the Central African Republic on 3 June 2021.

References

External links
 
 Lyon Profile

1998 births
Living people
Footballers from Lyon
Rwandan footballers
Rwanda international footballers
French footballers
French people of Rwandan descent
Association football defenders
Olympique Lyonnais players
Andrézieux-Bouthéon FC players
En Avant Guingamp players
Lyon La Duchère players
Championnat National players
Championnat National 2 players
Championnat National 3 players